Julius Rosenberg (May 12, 1918 – June 19, 1953) and Ethel Rosenberg (September 28, 1915 – June 19, 1953) were an American couple who were accused of spying for the Soviet Union, including providing top-secret information about American radar, sonar, jet propulsion engines, and nuclear weapon designs. Convicted of espionage in 1951, they were executed by the federal government of the United States in 1953 at Sing Sing Correctional Facility in Ossining, New York, becoming the first American civilians to be executed for such charges and the first to receive that penalty during peacetime.

Other convicted co-conspirators were sentenced to prison, including Ethel's brother, David Greenglass (who had made a plea agreement), Harry Gold, and Morton Sobell. Klaus Fuchs, a German scientist working in Los Alamos, was convicted in the United Kingdom.

For decades, many people, including the Rosenbergs' sons (Michael and Robert Meeropol), maintained that Julius and Ethel were innocent of spying on their country and were victims of Cold War paranoia. The extent of the Rosenbergs' activities came to light, however, when the U.S. government declassified information about them after the fall of the Soviet Union. This declassified information included a trove of decoded Soviet cables (code-name: Venona), which detailed Julius's role as a courier and recruiter for the Soviets, and information about Ethel's role as an accessory who helped recruit her brother David into the spy ring and did clerical tasks such as typing up documents that Julius then passed to the Soviets. In 2008, the National Archives of the United States published most of the grand jury testimony related to the prosecution of the Rosenbergs.

Early lives and education

Julius Rosenberg was born on May 12, 1918, in New York City to a family of Jewish immigrants from the Russian Empire. The family moved to the Lower East Side by the time Julius was 11. His parents worked in the shops of the Lower East Side as Julius attended Seward Park High School. Julius became a leader in the Young Communist League USA while at City College of New York during the Great Depression. In 1939, he graduated with a degree in electrical engineering.

Ethel Greenglass was born on September 28, 1915, to a Jewish family in Manhattan, New York City. She had a brother, David Greenglass. She originally was an aspiring actress and singer, but eventually took a secretarial job at a shipping company. She became involved in labor disputes and joined the Young Communist League, where she met Julius in 1936. They married in 1939.

Espionage
Julius Rosenberg joined the Army Signal Corps Engineering Laboratories at Fort Monmouth, New Jersey, in 1940, where he worked as an engineer-inspector until 1945. He was discharged when the U.S. Army discovered his previous membership in the Communist Party. Important research on electronics, communications, radar and guided missile controls was undertaken at Fort Monmouth during World War II.

According to a 2001 book by his former handler Alexander Feklisov, Rosenberg was originally recruited to spy for the interior ministry of the Soviet Union, NKVD, on Labor Day 1942 by former spymaster Semyon Semyonov. By this time, following the invasion by Nazi Germany in June 1941, the Soviet Union had become an ally of the Western powers, which included the United States after Pearl Harbor. Rosenberg had been introduced to Semyonov by Bernard Schuster, a high-ranking member of the Communist Party USA and NKVD liaison for Earl Browder. After Semyonov was recalled to Moscow in 1944 his duties were taken over by Feklisov.

Rosenberg provided thousands of classified reports from Emerson Radio, including a complete proximity fuse. Under Feklisov's supervision, Rosenberg recruited sympathetic individuals into NKVD service, including Joel Barr, Alfred Sarant, William Perl, and Morton Sobell, also an engineer. Perl supplied Feklisov, under Rosenberg's direction, with thousands of documents from the National Advisory Committee for Aeronautics, including a complete set of design and production drawings for Lockheed's P-80 Shooting Star, the first U.S. operational jet fighter. Feklisov learned through Rosenberg that Ethel's brother David Greenglass was working on the top-secret Manhattan Project at the Los Alamos National Laboratory; he directed Julius to recruit Greenglass.

In February 1944, Rosenberg succeeded in recruiting a second source of Manhattan Project information, engineer Russell McNutt, who worked on designs for the plants at Oak Ridge National Laboratory. For this success Rosenberg received a $100 bonus. McNutt's employment provided access to secrets about processes for manufacturing weapons-grade uranium.

The USSR and the U.S. were allies during World War II, but the Americans did not share information with, or seek assistance from, the Soviet Union regarding the Manhattan Project. The West was shocked by the speed with which the Soviets were able to stage their first nuclear test, "Joe 1", on August 29, 1949. However, the head official of the Soviet nuclear project, Lavrentiy Beria, used foreign intelligence, which he did not trust by default, only as a third-party check, rather than giving it directly to the design teams, who he did not clear to know about the espionage efforts, and the development was indigenous; considering that the pace of the Soviet program was set primarily by the amount of uranium that it could procure, it is difficult for scholars to judge accurately how much time was saved, if any.

Rosenberg case

Arrest

In January 1950, the U.S. discovered that Klaus Fuchs, a German refugee theoretical physicist working for the British mission in the Manhattan Project, had given key documents to the Soviets throughout the war. Fuchs identified his courier as American Harry Gold, who was arrested on May 23, 1950.

On June 15, 1950, David Greenglass was arrested by the FBI for espionage and soon confessed to having passed secret information on to the USSR through Gold. He also claimed that his sister Ethel's husband Julius Rosenberg had convinced David's wife Ruth to recruit him while visiting him in Albuquerque, New Mexico, in 1944. He said Julius had passed secrets and thus linked him to the Soviet contact agent Anatoli Yakovlev. This connection would be necessary as evidence if there was to be a conviction for espionage of the Rosenbergs.

On July 17, 1950, Julius Rosenberg was arrested on suspicion of espionage based on David Greenglass's confession. On August 11, 1950, Ethel Rosenberg was arrested after testifying before a grand jury (see section, below).

Another conspirator, Morton Sobell, fled with his family to Mexico City after Greenglass was arrested. They took assumed names and he tried to figure out a way to reach Europe without a passport. Abandoning that effort, he returned to Mexico City. He claimed that he was kidnapped by members of the Mexican secret police and driven to the U.S. border, where he was arrested by U.S. forces. The U.S. government claimed Sobell was arrested by the Mexican police for bank robbery on August 16, 1950, and extradited the next day to the United States in Laredo, Texas.

Grand jury

Twenty senior government officials met secretly on February 8, 1950, to discuss the Rosenberg case. Gordon Dean, the chairman of the Atomic Energy Commission, said: "It looks as though Rosenberg is the kingpin of a very large ring, and if there is any way of breaking him by having the shadow of a death penalty over him, we want to do it." Myles Lane, a member of the prosecution team, said that the case against Ethel Rosenberg was "not too strong", but that it was "very important that she be convicted too, and given a stiff sentence." FBI director J Edgar Hoover wrote that "proceeding against the wife will serve as a lever" to make Julius talk.

Their case against Ethel Rosenberg was resolved 10 days before the start of the trial, when David and Ruth Greenglass were interviewed a second time. They were persuaded to change their original stories. David originally had said that he had passed the atomic data he had collected to Julius on a New York street corner. After being interviewed this second time, he said that he had given this information to Julius in the living room of the Rosenbergs' New York apartment. Ethel, at Julius's request, had taken his notes and "typed them up." In her re-interview, Ruth Greenglass expanded on her husband's version: 
Julius then took the info into the bathroom and read it and when he came out he called Ethel and told her she had to type this information immediately ... Ethel then sat down at the typewriter which she placed on a bridge table in the living room and proceeded to type the information that David had given to Julius. As a result of this new testimony, all charges against Ruth Greenglass were dropped.

On August 11, Ethel Rosenberg testified before a grand jury. For all questions, she asserted her right to not answer as provided by the U.S. Constitution's Fifth Amendment against self-incrimination. FBI agents took her into custody as she left the courthouse. Her attorney asked the U.S. commissioner to parole her in his custody over the weekend, so that she could make arrangements for her two young children. The request was denied. Julius and Ethel were put under pressure to incriminate others involved in the spy ring. Neither offered any further information. On August 17, the grand jury returned an indictment alleging 11 overt acts. Both Julius and Ethel Rosenberg were indicted, as were David Greenglass and Anatoli Yakovlev.

Trial and conviction

The trial of the Rosenbergs and Sobell on federal espionage charges began on March 6, 1951, in the U.S. District Court for the Southern District of New York. Judge Irving Kaufman presided over the trial, with Assistant U.S. Attorney Irving Saypol leading the prosecution and criminal defense lawyer Emmanuel Bloch representing the Rosenbergs. The prosecution's primary witness, David Greenglass, said that he turned over to Julius Rosenberg a sketch of the cross-section of an implosion-type atom bomb. This was the "Fat Man" bomb dropped on Nagasaki, Japan, as opposed to a bomb with the "gun method" triggering device used in the "Little Boy" bomb dropped on Hiroshima.

On March 29, 1951, the Rosenbergs were convicted of espionage. They were sentenced to death on April 5 under Section 2 of the Espionage Act of 1917, which provides that anyone convicted of transmitting or attempting to transmit to a foreign government "information relating to the national defense" may be imprisoned for life or put to death.

Prosecutor Roy Cohn later claimed that his influence led to both Kaufman and Saypol being appointed to the Rosenberg case, and that Kaufman imposed the death penalty based on Cohn's personal recommendation. Cohn would go on later to work for Senator Joseph McCarthy, appointed as chief counsel to the investigations subcommittee during McCarthy's tenure as chairman of the Senate Government Operations Committee.

In imposing the death penalty, Kaufman noted that he held the Rosenbergs responsible not only for espionage but also for American deaths in the Korean War:

I believe your conduct in putting into the hands of the Russians the A-bomb years before our best scientists predicted Russia would perfect the bomb has already caused, in my opinion, the Communist aggression in Korea, with the resultant casualties exceeding 50,000 and who knows but that millions more of innocent people may pay the price of your treason. Indeed, by your betrayal you undoubtedly have altered the course of history to the disadvantage of our country.

The US government offered to spare the lives of both Julius and Ethel if Julius provided the names of other spies and they admitted their guilt. The Rosenbergs made a public statement: "By asking us to repudiate the truth of our innocence, the government admits its own doubts concerning our guilt ... we will not be coerced, even under pain of death, to bear false witness".

After conviction

Campaign for clemency
After the publication of an investigative series in the National Guardian and the formation of the National Committee to Secure Justice in the Rosenberg Case, some Americans came to believe both Rosenbergs were innocent or had received too harsh a sentence, particularly Ethel. A campaign was started to try to prevent the couple's execution. Between the trial and the executions, there were widespread protests and claims of antisemitism; the charges of antisemitism were widely believed abroad, but not among the vast majority in the United States. At a time when American fears about communism were high, the Rosenbergs did not receive support from mainstream Jewish organizations. The American Civil Liberties Union refused to acknowledge any violations of civil liberties in the case.

Across the world, especially in Western European capitals, there were numerous protests with picketing and demonstrations in favor of the Rosenbergs, along with editorials in otherwise pro-American newspapers, and a plea for clemency from the Pope. President Eisenhower, supported by public opinion and the media at home, ignored the overseas demands.

Jean-Paul Sartre, a Marxist existentialist philosopher and writer who won the Nobel Prize for Literature, described the trial as 

a legal lynching which smears with blood a whole nation. By killing the Rosenbergs, you have quite simply tried to halt the progress of science by human sacrifice. Magic, witch-hunts, autos-da-fé, sacrifices – we are here getting to the point: your country is sick with fear ... you are afraid of the shadow of your own bomb.

Others, including non-Communists such as Jean Cocteau and Harold Urey, a Nobel Prize-winning physical chemist, as well as Communists and left-leaning figures such as Nelson Algren, Bertolt Brecht, Albert Einstein, Dashiell Hammett, Frida Kahlo, and Diego Rivera, protested the position of the American government in what the French termed the U.S. Dreyfus affair. Einstein and Urey pleaded with President Truman to pardon the Rosenbergs. In May 1951, Pablo Picasso wrote for the communist French newspaper L'Humanité, "The hours count. The minutes count. Do not let this crime against humanity take place." The all-black labor union International Longshoremen's Association Local 968 stopped working for a day in protest. Cinema artists such as Fritz Lang registered their protest. Pope Pius XII appealed to President Dwight D. Eisenhower to spare the couple, but Eisenhower refused on February 11, 1953. All other appeals were also unsuccessful.

Execution
The execution was delayed from the originally scheduled date of June 18, because Supreme Court Associate Justice William O. Douglas had granted a stay of execution on the previous day. That stay resulted from intervention in the case by Fyke Farmer, a Tennessee lawyer whose efforts had previously been scorned by the Rosenbergs' attorney, Emanuel Hirsch Bloch.

The execution was scheduled for 11 p.m. that evening, during the Sabbath, which begins and ends around sunset. Bloch asked for more time, filing a complaint that execution on the Sabbath offended the defendants' Jewish heritage. Rhoda Laks, another attorney on the Rosenbergs' defense team, also made this argument before Judge Kaufman. The defense's strategy backfired. Kaufman, who also stated his concerns about executing the Rosenbergs on the Sabbath, rescheduled the execution for 8 p.m.—before sunset and the Sabbath—the regular time for executions at Sing Sing.

On June 19, 1953, Julius died after the first electric shock. Ethel's execution did not go smoothly. After she was given the normal course of three electric shocks, attendants removed the strapping and other equipment only to have doctors determine that Ethel's heart was still beating. Two more electric shocks were applied, and at the conclusion eyewitnesses reported that smoke rose from her head.

The funeral services were held in Brooklyn on June 21. Ethel and Julius Rosenberg were buried at Wellwood Cemetery, a Jewish cemetery in Pinelawn, New York. The Times reported that 500 people attended, while some 10,000 stood outside:

In 1953, socialist historian W. E. B. Du Bois wrote a poem titled "The Rosenbergs", which began "Crucify us, Vengeance of God, as we crucify two more Jews" and ended "Who has been crowned on yonder stair? Red Resurrection? Or Black Despair?"

The Rosenbergs were the only American civilians executed for espionage during the Cold War.

Soviet nuclear program
Senator Daniel Patrick Moynihan, vice-chairman of the Senate Select Committee on Intelligence, investigated how much the Soviet spy ring helped the USSR to build their bomb. Moynihan found that in 1945, physicist Hans Bethe estimated that the Soviets would be able to build their own bomb in five years. "Thanks to information provided by their agents", Moynihan wrote in his book Secrecy, "they did it in four".

Nikita Khrushchev, leader of the Soviet Union from 1953 to 1964, said in his posthumously-published memoir that he "cannot specifically say what kind of help the Rosenbergs provided us" but that he learned from Joseph Stalin and Vyacheslav Molotov that they "had provided very significant help in accelerating the production of our atomic bomb."

Boris V. Brokhovich, the engineer who later became director of Chelyabinsk-40, the plutonium production reactor and extraction facility that the Soviet Union used to create its first bomb material, alleged that Khrushchev was a "silly fool". He said the Soviets had developed their own bomb by trial and error. "You sat the Rosenbergs in the electric chair for nothing", he said. "We got nothing from the Rosenbergs."

The notes allegedly typed by Ethel apparently contained little that was directly used in the Soviet atomic bomb project. According to Alexander Feklisov, the former Soviet agent who was Julius's contact, the Rosenbergs did not provide the Soviet Union with any useful material about the atomic bomb: "He [Julius] didn't understand anything about the atomic bomb and he couldn't help us."

Later developments

1995 Venona decryptions

The Venona project was a United States counterintelligence program to decrypt messages transmitted by the intelligence agencies of the Soviet Union. Initiated when the Soviet Union was an ally of the U.S., the program continued during the Cold War when it was considered an enemy.

In 1995, the U.S. government made public many documents decoded by the Venona project, showing Julius Rosenberg's role as part of a productive ring of spies. For example, a 1944 cable (which gives the name of Ruth Greenglass in clear text) says that Ruth's husband David is being recruited as a spy by his sister (that is, Ethel Rosenberg) and her husband. The cable also makes clear that the sister's husband is involved enough in espionage to have his own codename ("Antenna" and later "Liberal"). Ethel did not have a codename; however, KGB messages which were contained in the Venona project's Vassiliev files, and which were not made public until 2009, revealed that both Ethel and Julius had regular contact with at least two KGB agents and were active in recruiting not only Ethel's brother David Greenglass, but also another Manhattan Project spy named Russell McNutt.

The messages decoded by the Venona project were not made public during the Rosenbergs' trial, which relied instead on testimony from their collaborators. Nevertheless, these decryptions formed the background of U.S. government investigation and prosecutions of American communists during the Cold War period.

2001 David Greenglass statements

In 2001, David Greenglass recanted his testimony about his sister having typed the notes. He said, "I frankly think my wife did the typing, but I don't remember." He said he gave false testimony to protect himself and his wife, Ruth, and that he was encouraged by the prosecution to do so. "My wife is more important to me than my sister. Or my mother or my father, OK? And she was the mother of my children."

He refused to express remorse for his decision to betray his sister, saying only that he did not realize that the prosecution would push for the death penalty.  He stated, "I would not sacrifice my wife and my children for my sister."

2008 release of grand jury testimony
At the grand jury, Ruth Greenglass was asked, "Didn't you write [the information] down on a piece of paper?"  She replied, "Yes, I wrote [the information] down on a piece of paper and [Julius Rosenberg] took it with him."  But at the trial, she testified that Ethel Rosenberg typed up notes about the atomic bomb.

Numerous articles were published in 2008 related to the Rosenberg case. Deputy Attorney General of the United States William P. Rogers, who had been part of the prosecution of the Rosenbergs, discussed their strategy at the time in relation to seeking the death sentence for Ethel. He said they had urged the death sentence for Ethel in an effort to extract a full confession from Julius. He reportedly said, "She called our bluff", as she made no effort to push her husband to any action.

2008 Morton Sobell's statements

In 2008, Morton Sobell was interviewed after the revelations from grand jury testimony. He admitted that he had given documents to the Soviet contact, but said these had to do with defensive radar and weaponry. He confirmed that Julius Rosenberg was "in a conspiracy that delivered to the Soviets classified military and industrial information ... [on] the atomic bomb," and "He never told me about anything else that he was engaged in."

He said that he thought the hand-drawn diagrams and other atomic-bomb details that were acquired by David Greenglass and passed to Julius were of "little value" to the Soviet Union, and were used only to corroborate what they had already learned from the other atomic spies. He also said that he believed Ethel Rosenberg was aware of her husband's deeds, but took no part in them.

In a subsequent letter to The New York Times, Sobell denied that he knew anything about Julius Rosenberg's alleged atomic espionage activities, and that the only thing he knew for sure was what he himself did in association with Julius Rosenberg.

2009 Vassiliev notebooks based on KGB archives
In 2009, extensive notes collected from KGB archives were made public in a book published by Yale University Press: Spies: The Rise and Fall of the KGB in America, written by John Earl Haynes, Harvey Klehr, and Alexander Vassiliev; Vassiliev's notebooks included KGB comments concerning Julius and Ethel Rosenberg.

The notebooks make clear that the KGB considered Julius Rosenberg an effective agent and his wife Ethel a supporter of his work. According to Vassiliev, Julius and Ethel worked personally with KGB agents who were given the codenames Twain and Callistratus and were also described as being the ones who recruited Greenglass and McNutt for the Manhattan Project spy mission. Though the public release of Vassiliev's notebooks did not occur until 2009, the notebooks had in fact been originally intercepted during the Venona decryptions.

Rosenberg children

The Rosenbergs' two sons, Michael and Robert, spent years trying to prove the innocence of their parents. They were orphaned by the executions and were not adopted by their many aunts or uncles, although they initially spent time under the care of their grandmothers and in a children's home. They were adopted by the social activist Abel Meeropol and his wife Anne, and assumed the Meeropol surname.

After Morton Sobell's 2008 confession, they acknowledged their father had been involved in espionage, but said that whatever atomic bomb information he passed to the Russians was, at best, superfluous, that the case was riddled with prosecutorial and judicial misconduct, that their mother was convicted on flimsy evidence to place leverage on her husband, and that neither deserved the death penalty.

Michael and Robert co-wrote a book about their and their parents' lives, We Are Your Sons: The Legacy of Ethel and Julius Rosenberg (1975). Robert wrote a later memoir, An Execution in the Family: One Son's Journey (2003). In 1990, he founded the Rosenberg Fund for Children, a nonprofit foundation that provides support for children of targeted liberal activists, and youth who are targeted as activists.

Michael's daughter, Ivy Meeropol, directed a 2004 documentary about her grandparents, Heir to an Execution, which was featured at the Sundance Film Festival.

Their sons' current position is that Julius was legally guilty of the conspiracy charge, though not of atomic spying, while Ethel was only generally aware of his activities. The children say that their father did not deserve the death penalty and that their mother was wrongly convicted. They continue to campaign for Ethel to be posthumously legally exonerated.

In 2015, following the most recent grand jury transcript release, Michael and Robert Meeropol called on U.S. President Barack Obama's administration to acknowledge that Ethel Rosenberg's conviction and execution was wrongful and to issue a proclamation exonerating her.

In March 2016, Michael and Robert (via the Rosenberg Fund for Children) launched a petition campaign calling on President Obama and U.S. Attorney General Loretta Lynch to formally exonerate Ethel Rosenberg. In October 2016, both Michael and Robert Meeropol spoke with Anderson Cooper in an interview which aired on 60 Minutes. In January 2017 Senator Elizabeth Warren sent Obama a letter requesting consideration of the exoneration request.
In 2021 Ethel's sons restarted the campaign to pardon Ethel, as they were more optimistic that President Biden will consider this favorably. Ethel Rosenberg: A Cold War Tragedy by Anne Sebba was published by Orion Books on 24 June 2021.

Artistic representations
 The song "Julius and Ethel" written by Bob Dylan in 1983 is based on the Rosenberg case.
 E. L. Doctorow's 1971 novel The Book of Daniel  is loosely based on the Rosenbergs and their sons' attempt to clear their name. The 1983 film by Sidney Lumet, Daniel, is in turn based on the novel.
 The main character in Sylvia Plath's novel The Bell Jar is morbidly interested in the Rosenbergs' case.
 Images of the Rosenbergs are engraved on a memorial in Havana, Cuba. The accompanying caption says they were murdered.
 The ghost of Ethel appears in the play Angels in America, where she haunts attorney Roy Cohn as he dies of AIDS.
 The execution is explored in great detail and serves as the premise of Robert Coover's 1977 novel The Public Burning.
 Pakistani poet Faiz Ahmad Faiz (1911–1984), renowned for his socialist views, wrote a poem "" ('We who were killed in the dark lanes') in tribute to the Rosenbergs. It is considered a classic piece of Urdu literature and part of contemporary folklore and poetic discourses.
 Singer Billy Joel mentions the Rosenbergs in the lyrics of his 1989 song "We Didn't Start the Fire".

See also
 Atomic spies
 Soviet atomic bomb project

 Capital punishment by the United States federal government
 List of people executed by the United States federal government

Notes

Works cited
 Feklisov, Aleksandr, and Kostin, Sergei. The Man Behind the Rosenbergs. Enigma Books, 2003. .
 Roberts, Sam. The Brother: The Untold Story of the Rosenberg Case. Random House, 2001. .
 Schneir, Walter, and Scheir, Miriam. Invitation to an Inquest. Pantheon Books, 1983. .
 Schrecker, Ellen. Many Are the Crimes: McCarthyism in America. Little, Brown and Company, 1998. .

Further reading
 Sebba, Anne, Ethel Rosenberg, A Cold War Tragedy (Weidenfeld & Nicolson, 2021). 
Alman, Emily A. and David. Exoneration: The Trial of Julius and Ethel Rosenberg and Morton Sobell – Prosecutorial deceptions, suborned perjuries, anti-Semitism, and precedent for today's unconstitutional trials. Green Elms Press, 2010. 
 Carmichael, Virginia .Framing history: the Rosenberg story and the Cold War, (University of Minnesota Press, 1993) 
 Clune, Lori. "Great Importance World-Wide: Presidential Decision-Making and the Executions of Julius and Ethel Rosenberg." American Communist History 10.3 (2011): 263–284. online
 Doctorow, E. L.  The Book of Daniel. Random House Trade Paperbacks, 2007. 
 Deborah Friedell, "How Utterly Depreaved!" (review of Anne Sebba, Ethel Rosenberg: A Cold War Tragedy, Weidenfeld, 2021, 288 pp.), London Review of Books, vol. 43, no. 13 (1 July 2021), pp. 11–13
 Goldstein, Alvin H. The Unquiet Death of Julius and Ethel Rosenberg, 1975. 
 Harris, Brian. "Injustice", Sutton Publishing. 2006.  (An examination of the trial)
 Hornblum, Allen M. The Invisible Harry Gold: The Man Who Gave the Soviets the Atom Bomb, Yale University Press. 2010. 
 Meeropol, Michael, " 'A Spy Who Turned His Family In':  Revisiting David Greenglass and the Rosenberg Case," American Communist History (May 2018)  
 Meeropol, Michael, ed. The Rosenberg Letters: A Complete Edition of the Prison Correspondence of Julius and Ethel Rosenberg. New York: Garland Publishing, 1994. 
 Meeropol, Robert and Michael Meeropol. We Are Your Sons: The Legacy of Ethel and Julius Rosenberg. University of Illinois Press, 1986. . Chapter 15 is a detailed refutation of Radosh and Milton's scholarship.
 Meeropol, Robert.  An Execution in the Family: One Son's Journey. St. Martin's Press, 2003. 
 Nason, Tema. Ethel: The Fictional Autobiography of Ethel Rosenberg. Delacourt, 1990.  and by Syracuse, 2002, 
 
 Radosh, Ronald and Joyce Milton. The Rosenberg File: A Search for the Truth. Henry Holt (1983). . a standard scholarly history
 Roberts, Sam. The Brother: The Untold Story of the Rosenberg Case, Random House, 2003, 
 
  Sam Roberts, The Brother: The Untold Story of Atomic Spy David Greenglass and How He Sent His Sister, Ethel Rosenberg, to the Electric Chair, Random House, 2001. 
  Walter Schneir & Miriam Schneir, Invitation to an Inquest: Reopening the Rosenberg Case, 1973. 
 Schneir, Walter. Final Verdict: What Really Happened in the Rosenberg Case, Melville House, 2010. 
 Trahair, Richard C.S. and Robert Miller. Encyclopedia of Cold War Espionage, Spies, and Secret Operations. Enigma Books, 2009. 
 Wexley, John. The Judgment of Julius and Ethel Rosenberg. Ballantine Books, 1977. 
 Yalkowsky, Stanley (1990). The Murder of the Rosenbergs. Crucible Publications. 
 Zinn, Howard. A People's History of the United States. p. 434 
 Zion, Sidney.  The autobiography of Roy Cohn, Lyle Stuart Inc, 1988.

Other languages
  Florin Aftalion, La Trahison des Rosenberg, JC Lattès, Paris, 2003
  Howard Fast, Mémoire d'un Rouge, éd. Payot & Rivage. Intéressant, traite de toute la période de l'avant seconde guerre mondiale et après (MacCarthysme, etc.) aux États-Unis. Nombreux témoignages. Plusieurs passages sur les Rosenberg notamment pp. 349 à 359
  Gérard A. Jaeger, Les Rosenberg. La chaise électrique pour délit d'opinion, Le Félin, 2003
  Julius and Ethel Rosenberg, Lettres de la maison de la mort, Gallimard, 1953
  Morton Sobell, On condamne bien les innocents, Hier et demain, 1974

External links

Archival collections
 Guide to the Playscript about the Julius and Ethel Rosenberg Espionage Trial. Special Collections and Archives, The UC Irvine Libraries, Irvine, California.

Other links
 An Interactive Rosenberg Espionage Ring Timeline and Archive
 Timeline of Events Relating to the Rosenberg Trial.
 Rosenberg trial transcript (excerpts as HTML, and the entire 2,563-page transcript as a PDF file)
 Ethel's brother says he trumped up evidence.
 Documents relating to the Julius and Ethel Rosenberg Case, Dwight D. Eisenhower Presidential Library
 Project Venona messages.
 Rosenberg FBI files (summary only)
 Heir to an Execution – An HBO documentary by Ivy Meeropol, the granddaughter of Ethel and Julius.
 A statement by the Rosenberg's sons in support of their exoneration
 An Interview with Robert Meeropol about the adoption
 National Committee to Reopen the Rosenberg Case
 Annotated bibliography for Ethel Rosenberg from the Alsos Digital Library for Nuclear Issues 
 Annotated bibliography for Julius Rosenberg from the Alsos Digital Library for Nuclear Issues 
 The Cold War International History Project (CWIHP) for Alexander Vassiliev's Notebooks
 Rosenberg Son: "My Parents Were Executed Under the Unconstitutional Espionage Act" – video report by Democracy Now!
 History on Trial: The Rosenberg Case in E.L. Doctorow's The Book of Daniel  by Santiago Juan-Navarro from The Grove: Working Papers on English Studies, Vol 6, 1999.
 Julius Rosenberg at court sentenced to death
 The WSWS speaks to Julius and Ethel Rosenberg’s son – An interview with Robert Meeropol
 Ethel Rosenberg on IMDb

 
1910s births
1953 deaths
1953 in politics
20th-century American trials
American Jews
American people convicted of spying for the Soviet Union
Criminal duos
Executed spies
Jewish-American history
Married couples
McCarthyism
Nuclear secrecy
Political prisoners
Political prisoners in the United States